The Essential Toni Braxton is a compilation album by the American recording artist Toni Braxton in Sony BMG's The Essential series. Released in February 2007, it follows the earlier compilations Ultimate Toni Braxton, released in 2003, and Braxton's Platinum & Gold Collection, released in 2004. The Essential is a 2 disc album with thirty-six of Braxton's best songs. It also includes a song done with her sister group The Braxtons, "The Good Life".

Background 
"The Essential Toni Braxton" became Braxton's second compilation, following 2003's "Ultimate Toni Braxton". The compilation contains 2 discs, with the first containing the majority of her hits, and the second containing non-singles from her previous albums, as well as remixes, collaborations and unreleased tracks. It was released on February 20, 2007 in the United States.

Content 
In addition to her previous hits, including "Another Sad Love Song", "Breathe Again", "Un-Break My Heart", "You're Makin' Me High", "He Wasn't Man Enough" and others, the first disc contains "Tell Me", from her 2002 album "More Than a Woman" and "Give U My Heart", a duet with Babyface to the soundtrack of the 1992 film Boomerang. The second disc contains some singles who performed very moderate on charts, such as "Hit the Freeway", many songs from her 1996 album "Secrets", the duet with Il Divo, "The Time of Our Lives", remixes from her remix compilation, "Un-Break My Heart: The Remix Collection", as well as her first single with her sisters, The Braxtons, called "Good Life".

Critical reception 

Andy Kellman of Allmusic gave to the compilation a rating of 4.5 out of 5 stars, writing that the album "amounts to an expanded update of 2003's Ultimate Toni Braxton, nearly doubling the content and digging deeper into the discography of one of the biggest R&B artists of the '90s. With the exception of favoring the R. Kelly remix of "How Many Ways" over the original, this set retains Ultimate's core 15 tracks while wisely choosing to use the studio version of "Seven Whole Days" instead of a live take. [...] Another pleasant surprise, tucked at the very end, is the inclusion of "Good Life," a 1990 single released by Toni and her four sisters as the Braxtons. If you want only the big hits, Ultimate will still do fine, but this set offers a more rounded and representative look back."

Mike Joseph of PopMatters gave the album 5 out of 10 stars, writing that, "It's hard to imagine why this album was even released. [...] and while it's a nice thing to have, it's by no means essential. This compilation contains just about every popular note Braxton ever offered, with a couple of mediocre dance mixes thrown in to add a bit of value to the project. [...] As a single disc containing all the necessary hits, it's the album you should probably bypass this bloated Essential set in favor of."

Chart performance 
"The Essential Toni Braxton" charted on the Top R&B/Hip-Hop Albums chart, peaking at number 48, remaining for two weeks on the chart.

Track listings

The Essential Toni Braxton

Charts

References

Toni Braxton compilation albums
Albums produced by Bryan-Michael Cox
Albums produced by David Foster
Albums produced by the Neptunes
Albums produced by R. Kelly
2007 greatest hits albums